The 2018 UEFA European Under-19 Championship qualifying competition was a men's under-19 football competition that determined the seven teams joining the automatically qualified hosts Finland in the 2018 UEFA European Under-19 Championship final tournament.

Apart from Finland, all remaining 54 UEFA member national teams entered the qualifying competition (including Kosovo who entered for the first time). Players born on or after 1 January 1999 are eligible to participate.

Format
The qualifying competition consists of two rounds:
Qualifying round: Apart from Spain and Portugal, which receive byes to the elite round as the teams with the highest seeding coefficient, the remaining 52 teams are drawn into 13 groups of four teams. Each group is played in single round-robin format at one of the teams selected as hosts after the draw. The 13 group winners and the 13 runners-up advance to the elite round.
Elite round: The 28 teams are drawn into seven groups of four teams. Each group is played in single round-robin format at one of the teams selected as hosts after the draw. The seven group winners qualify for the final tournament.

The schedule of each mini-tournament is as follows (Regulations Article 19.04):

Tiebreakers
In the qualifying round and elite round, teams are ranked according to points (3 points for a win, 1 point for a draw, 0 points for a loss), and if tied on points, the following tiebreaking criteria are applied, in the order given, to determine the rankings (Regulations Articles 14.01 and 14.02):
Points in head-to-head matches among tied teams;
Goal difference in head-to-head matches among tied teams;
Goals scored in head-to-head matches among tied teams;
If more than two teams are tied, and after applying all head-to-head criteria above, a subset of teams are still tied, all head-to-head criteria above are reapplied exclusively to this subset of teams;
Goal difference in all group matches;
Goals scored in all group matches;
Penalty shoot-out if only two teams have the same number of points, and they met in the last round of the group and are tied after applying all criteria above (not used if more than two teams have the same number of points, or if their rankings are not relevant for qualification for the next stage);
Disciplinary points (red card = 3 points, yellow card = 1 point, expulsion for two yellow cards in one match = 3 points);
UEFA coefficient for the qualifying round draw;
Drawing of lots.

Qualifying round

Draw
The draw for the qualifying round was held on 13 December 2016, 10:00 CET (UTC+1), at the UEFA headquarters in Nyon, Switzerland.

The teams were seeded according to their coefficient ranking, calculated based on the following:
2014 UEFA European Under-19 Championship final tournament and qualifying competition (qualifying round and elite round)
2015 UEFA European Under-19 Championship final tournament and qualifying competition (qualifying round and elite round)
2016 UEFA European Under-19 Championship final tournament and qualifying competition (qualifying round and elite round)

Each group contained one team from Pot A, one team from Pot B, one team from Pot C, and one team from Pot D. For political reasons, Azerbaijan and Armenia, Serbia and Kosovo, and Bosnia and Herzegovina and Kosovo would not be drawn in the same group.

Notes
Teams marked in bold have qualified for the final tournament.

Groups
The qualifying round must be played by 19 November 2017, and on the following FIFA International Match Calendar dates unless all four teams agree to play on another date:
28 August – 5 September 2017
2–10 October 2017
6–14 November 2017

Times up to 28 October 2017 are CEST (UTC+2), thereafter times are CET (UTC+1).

Group 1

Group 2

Group 3

Group 4

Group 5

Group 6

Group 7

Group 8

Group 9

Group 10

Group 11

The France v Andorra match was completed with a 7–0 scoreline before a default victory was awarded.

Group 12

Group 13

Elite round

Draw
The draw for the elite round was held on 6 December 2017, 11:00 CET (UTC+1), at the UEFA headquarters in Nyon, Switzerland.

The teams were seeded according to their results in the qualifying round. Spain and Portugal, which received byes to the elite round, were automatically seeded into Pot A. Each group contained one team from Pot A, one team from Pot B, one team from Pot C, and one team from Pot D. Teams from the same qualifying round group could not be drawn in the same group.

Groups
The elite round must be played on the following FIFA International Match Calendar dates unless all four teams agree to play on another date:
19–27 March 2018

Times up to 24 March 2018 are CET (UTC+1), thereafter times are CEST (UTC+2).

Group 1

Group 2

Group 3

Group 4

Group 5

Group 6

Group 7

Qualified teams
The following eight teams qualified for the final tournament.

1 Bold indicates champions for that year. Italic indicates hosts for that year.

Goalscorers
9 goals

 Erling Haaland

8 goals

 Alexandru Mățan

6 goals

 Eddie Nketiah
 Kai Havertz
 Anastasios Douvikas
 Dimitar Mitrovski

5 goals

 Jens Odgaard
 Jonas Wind
 Manuel Wintzheimer
 Zsombor Bévárdi
 Gianluca Scamacca
 Jack Aitchison
 Muhayer Oktay

4 goals

 Marko Regža
 Ferdi Kadioglu
 Donyell Malen
 Eman Markovic
 Olimpiu Moruțan
 Teddy Bergqvist

3 goals

 Vahan Bichakhchyan
 Kelvin Arase
 Mike Trésor Ndayishimiye
 Antonín Růsek
 Richard Sedláček
 Andreas Poulsen
 Mason Mount
 Myziane Maolida
 Jan-Niklas Beste
 Arne Maier
 Andrea Pinamonti
 Bogdans Samoilovs
 Jani Atanasov
 Bojan Kolevski
 Gedson Fernandes
 Jayson Molumby
 Tudor Băluță
 Ivan Ignatyev
 Žan Celar
 Abel Ruiz
 Nedim Bajrami
 Güven Yalçın

2 goals

 Christoph Baumgartner
 Nicolas Meister
 Anthony Schmid
 Bahadur Haziyev
 Thibaud Verlinden
 Sandro Kulenović
 Patrik Žitný
 Reiss Nelson
 Jadon Sancho
 Nabil Alioui
 Moussa Diaby
 Amine Gouiri
 Lenny Pintor
 Thody Elie Youan
 Atakan Akkaynak
 Dimitrios Emmanouilidis
 Norbert Kundrák
 Levente Lustyik
 Alexander Torvund
 Matteo Gabbia
 Nicolò Zaniolo
 Madi Zhakypbayev
 Joël Piroe
 Christian Borchgrevink
 Leo Skiri Østigård
 David Kopacz
 Adrian Łyszczarz
 João Filipe
 Jonathan Afolabi
 Lee O'Connor
 Robert Moldoveanu
 Daniil Utkin
 Mikey Johnston
 Glenn Middleton
 Đorđe Jovanović
 Strahinja Jovanović
 Tomi Horvat
 Adrian Edqvist
 Andi Zeqiri
 Olexiy Kashchuk
 Oleksandr Safronov
 Vladyslav Supriaha
 Liam Cullen

1 goal

 Klajdi Burba
 Ricard Fernández
 Albert Grau
 Hovhannes Harutyunyan
 Karen Melkonyan
 Michael John Lema
 Miroslav Khlebosolov
 Francis Amuzu
 Indy Boonen
 Sebastiaan Bornauw
 Milan Corryn
 Hannes Delcroix
 Sieben Dewaele
 Daam Foulon
 Loïs Openda
 Amar Ćatić
 Jasmin Čeliković
 Jusuf Gazibegović
 Benjamin Hadžić
 Nedim Hadžić
 Enio Zilić
 Andrea Hristov
 Stanislav Ivanov
 Toni Ivanov
 Kaloyan Krastev
 Duje Javorčić
 Darko Nejašmić
 Dario Špikić
 Panagiotis Louka
 Jack Roles
 Martin Graiciar
 David Heidenreich
 Ladislav Krejčí
 Michal Sadílek
 Jakub Šípek
 Carl Holse
 Kasper Poul Mølgaard Jørgensen
 Mads Roerslev
 Ben Brereton
 Elliot Embleton
 George Hirst
 Erik Sorga
 Lukas Grenaa Giessing
 Antoine Bernede
 Michaël Cuisance
 Rafik Guitane
 Moussa Sylla
 Dan-Axel Zagadou
 Levan Kharabadze
 Nika Ninua
 Alfons Amade
 Yari Otto
 Sam Schreck
 Christos Giousis
 Alexandros Gkargkalatzidis
 Dimitrios Ntalakouras
 Marios Siampanis
 Attila Mocsi
 Szabolcs Schön
 Levente Szabo
 Kolbeinn Finnsson
 Daníel Hafsteinsson
 Kristofer Kristinsson
 Stefan Alexander Ljubicic
 Eylon Almog
 Yarden Shua
 Davide Bettella
 Enrico Brignola
 Christian Capone
 Filippo Melegoni
 Zhanali Pairuz
 Gentrit Limani
 Abit Salihu
 Jānis Grīnbergs
 Kristers Aldis Puriņš
 Kristers Tobers
 Noah Frick
 Kevin D'Anzico
 Yannick Schaus
 Vincent Thill
 Darko Churlinov
 Elif Elmas
 Bojan Miovski
 Filip Trajanovski
 Andrea Borg
 Denis Furtună
 Vsevolod Nihaev
 Ion Postica
 Ilija Vukotić
 Zakaria Aboukhlal
 Tom van de Looi
 Orkun Kökçü
 Ché Nunnely
 Danny Amos
 Eoin Toal
 Jens Petter Hauge
 Simen Bolkan Nordli
 Sebastian Pedersen
 Tobias Svendsen
 Hugo Vetlesen
 Sebastian Bergier
 Marco Drawz
 Riccardo Grym
 Jakub Moder
 Aron Stasiak
 Sebastian Walukiewicz
 Pedro Correia
 Thierry Correia
 Mesaque Djú
 José Gomes
 Diogo Queirós
 Aaron Connolly
 Neil Farrugia
 Michael Obafemi
 Rowan Roache
 Claudiu Micovschi
 Andrei Sîntean
 Magomed-Shapi Suleymanov
 Nayair Tiknizyan
 Dmitri Tsypchenko
 Wallace Duffy
 Fraser Hornby
 Kerr McInroy
 Luka Ilić
 Dejan Joveljić
 Igor Maksimović
 Njegoš Petrović
 Jug Stanojev
 Aleksa Terzić
 Adam Brenkus
 Matej Grešák
 Michal Kráľovič
 Jozef Špyrka
 Michal Tomič
 Martin Vician
 Adam Gnezda Čerin
 Vanja Drkušič
 David Zec
 Jordi Mboula
 Alejandro Pozo
 Joseph Colley
 Dejan Kulusekvski
 Simon Marklund
 Joel Mumbongo
 Adil Titi
 Mersim Asllani
 Nishan Burkart
 Serge Müller
 Filip Ugrinic
 Ufukcan Engin
 Abdülkadir Ömür
 Doğukan Sinik
 Valeriy Bondar
 Serhiy Buletsa
 Viktor Korniienko
 Vitalii Mykolenko
 James Alexander Spruce
 Momodou Touray

1 own goal

 Albert Khachumyan (against Czech Republic)
 Vladislav Malkevich (against Poland)
 Mahamadou Dembélé (against Bosnia and Herzegovina)
 Igor Chiperi (against Sweden)
 Julian Faye Lund (against Ukraine)
 Marco Frisoni (against Denmark)
 Jamie Barjonas (against Germany)
 Jorge Cuenca (against France)
 Burak Kapacak (against Slovakia)
 Joe Lewis (against Turkey)

References

External links

Qualification
2018
2017 in youth association football
2018 in youth association football
October 2017 sports events in Europe
November 2017 sports events in Europe
March 2018 sports events in Europe